Vivian Lau Wai-yan (born 5 February 1979) is a Hong Kong boccia player. 

At the 2020 Summer Paralympics, she won the silver medal in the pairs event alongside Leung Yuk Wing and Wong Kwan Hang.

References

External links
 

1979 births
Living people
Paralympic boccia players of Hong Kong
Paralympic silver medalists for Hong Kong
Paralympic medalists in boccia
Boccia players at the 2008 Summer Paralympics
Boccia players at the 2012 Summer Paralympics
Boccia players at the 2016 Summer Paralympics
Boccia players at the 2020 Summer Paralympics
Medalists at the 2020 Summer Paralympics